Kintrishi Strict Nature Reserve is a protected area in Kobuleti Municipality, Adjara region of Georgia in the upper part of the Kintrishi River at an altitude of 300–2,500 meters above sea level  between the village of Tskhemvani (Tskhemlovana) and Khino Mountain in the Meskheti Range. It was established in 1959 to preserve relict humid forests and wetlands, in addition to its high number  of endemic and threatened flora and fauna. Because of the ancient forests and high biodiversity within the nature reserve, it was inscribed on the UNESCO World Heritage List in 2021 as part of the Colchic Rainforests and Wetlands site.

Geography 
The broader Kintrishi Protected Areas include the Kintrishi Strict Nature Reserve  and Kintrishi National Park. 

The Kintrishi Strict Nature Reserve is located in the valley of the river Kintrishi, which originates from Mount Khino and discharges into the Black Sea near the resort town of Kobuleti. Kintrishi Strict Nature Reserve is bordered from the north by the Kobuleti forest administration, from the east by Shuakhevi Municipality, from the south  by Keda Municipality and from the southwest by Mtirala National Park. 
The nearby lake Sidzerdzali is outside the boundaries of the reserve.

Climate 
Surrounding mountains entrap humid air from the sea, thus providing high humidity in Kintrishi.

Biodiversity 
As part of the Euxine–Colchic deciduous forests ecoregion along an elevational gradient. Kintrishi Strict Nature Reserve contains a wide diversity of ecosystems, including lowland forests and montane meadows. Over 900 species of plants are found in the area, including the Common hornbeam, Oriental beech, and Caucasian fir. 65 of these species are endemic to the Caucasus. In addition, the reserve is hotspot of mayfly with 34 species. Roughly 189 bird species, 65 mammal species, and 14 reptile species have also been observed in or around the reserve. The reserve is located in a bottleneck where more than 1 million migrating raptors of 35 species pass through during the autumn.

See also 
 Kintrishi National Park
 Euxine-Colchic deciduous forests

References 

National parks of Georgia (country)
Protected areas established in 1959
Geography of Adjara
Tourist attractions in Adjara